BTE or bte may refer to:

Boltzmann transport equation
Barley yellow dwarf virus-like cap-independent translation element, a RNA element
Behind the ear hearing aid
Better Than Ezra, a rock band
Bristol Technology and Engineering Academy
bte. for binte, "daughter of", a component of an Arabic name
Being The Elite, video journals on YouTube, primarily featuring Bullet Club and The Elite
Build the Earth, a Minecraft project
Board of Technical Education (disambiguation)